The SEAT Ronda (codenamed 022A) was a small family car produced by the Spanish automaker SEAT from 1982 to 1986, and styled by Rayton Fissore in collaboration with the Technical Centre in Martorell. The Ronda was also briefly sold in the United Kingdom as the SEAT Málaga hatchback. 177,869 Rondas were built in total. The Ronda was the first SEAT model named after a Spanish city.

Design

The SEAT Ronda was a restyled SEAT Ritmo which in its turn derived from the Fiat Ritmo. However, in 1983 the Arbitration Chamber of Paris (subsequent to the acrimonious split between FIAT and SEAT) judged that the differences between those cars were important enough so as not to consider the Ronda to be a rebadged Ritmo. The most visible external design differences between a Ritmo and a Ronda are rectangular headlights on the Ronda in place of the round ones featured on the Ritmo, different tail lights and panels, and changed door handles. Mechanically, there were also some minor differences, mostly due to the use of Spanish-built engines and other parts.

The interior was more commodious than that of the original Ritmo, with a different dashboard with a more complete instrumentation. The seats were deeper and more comfortable, while the door panels were improved and the sound dampening was increased. The Spanish-made transmission was only available in a five-speed manual.

The Ronda featured a boot capacity of 370 litres which could be increased to 1250 litres by folding rear seats. It was introduced with locally built engines from the 124 series or a larger twin cam 1.6, as well as a 1.7-litre diesel unit.  Later, a version of Fiat's two-litre engine with a Porsche-developed head (System Porsche) was also installed in the rare Ronda Crono 2000 2.0 model. Only 800 of these were built. After an Autumn-1984 facelift, the Ronda received the "System Porsche" petrol engines which were developed for the Ibiza. The car was now called the Ronda P and carried a stylized "P" on the rear side.

Powertrain
The engines were:

Ronda (Petrol, 1982-1984)
1.2    1197 cc    
1.4    1438 cc    
1.6    1592 cc    
2.0    1995 cc    

Ronda P (Petrol, 1984-1986)
1.2    1193 cc    
1.5    1461 cc    

Diesel (1982-1986)
1.7 D  1714 cc

The dispute with Fiat

1982 saw the end of almost 30 years of co-operation between SEAT and the automaker Fiat. In order to conform with the end of partnership agreement signed by the two automakers, SEAT had to quickly restyle its entire model range to be able to offer its models on sale, distinguishing its cars from those of the Italian firm. This was marked by a change in SEAT's brand logo and the first car launched without Fiat involvement, the SEAT Ronda, appeared that same year.

The launch of that model though sparked a lawsuit from Fiat against SEAT, as the former claimed the car was still too similar to a car in Fiat's own range, the Fiat Ritmo. In defence of SEAT, the then president of the company, Juan Miguel Antoñanzas, showed a Ronda to the press with all the alterations from the Fiat Ritmo painted bright yellow, to highlight the differences.  An El País journalist who covered the trial claimed that the result was spectacular.

The case was eventually taken to the ICC International Court of Arbitration in Paris which in 1983 declared that differences between the cars were sufficiently substantial for the Ronda not to be judged as a rebadged Ritmo, ending the dispute in favour of SEAT. This also meant that SEAT was free to export the Ronda (and soon afterwards also the Fura), although the car never sold particularly well outside of Spain. Rumour at the time had it that Fiat was angry because the Ronda restyling was in fact too close to their own planned restyling for the Fiat Ritmo, which they had to scrap. Dutch car magazine Autovisie comparison tested the Ronda and the Ritmo in May 1983; the Ritmo was marginally quicker and lighter, and more modern overall, but the Ronda countered with a five to six per cent lower price.

References

Ronda
Compact cars
Front-wheel-drive vehicles
Cars introduced in 1982
Cars discontinued in 1986